Gong Kedak is a small village in Pasir Puteh District in Kelantan state, Malaysia with covered by rainforest. Bukit Puteri hill suit the Gong Kedak as most strategic place for air force military base.  The new Royal Malaysian Air Force Base, RMAF Gong Kedak is located here in Pasir Puteh territory Kelantan state.

History 
On December 10, 1941, Imperial Japanese forces captured the Gong Kedak Airfield after a landing on Kuala Besut.

Climate
With more than 4000mm rainfall annually, Gong Kedak is one of the highest and wettest place in Malaysia.

Pasir Puteh District